Ford Caminhões was a division of Ford Brasil that has truck production lines in Brazil. The first cargo vehicles produced by North American Ford were derived from the Ford Model T, called TT, and were produced from 1917. The Model TTs were imported from the beginning of the Brazilian subsidiary's operations in 1919.

History
Ford Caminhões launched its first national truck, the F-600, which left the assembly line on August 26, 1957, following the Target Plan of Juscelino Kubitschek's government. The nationalization index was 40% with the V8 gasoline engine still imported. In 1958 it began to receive the Y-block V8 engine produced in Brazil.

Local production by Ford Brasil began in 1957 with the Ford F-Series models and the Cargo line, the latter since 1985.

In 2019, Ford announced the closure of the truck plant in Brazil.

Galery

References

External links 
 Lexicar site

1957 establishments in Brazil
2019 disestablishments in Brazil
Brazilian subsidiaries of foreign companies
Defunct motor vehicle manufacturers of Brazil
Companies based in São Paulo (state)
Vehicle manufacturing companies established in 1981
Vehicle manufacturing companies disestablished in 2019
Truck manufacturers of Brazil